This list of French exonyms for Dutch toponyms shows the French names of cities and villages in the Netherlands used by the French and francophones living outside France.

Provinces

Cities

See also
List of French exonyms for Italian toponyms
List of French exonyms for German toponyms
List of English exonyms for Dutch toponyms

References

French exonyms for Dutch toponyms
French exonyms
French exonyms
Dutch language